The 2009 Whyte & Mackay Premier League was a darts tournament organised by the Professional Darts Corporation.

The tournament kicked off at the Echo Arena Liverpool, which hosted the biggest ever crowd for a PDC event of almost 8,000 in 2008.

New venues in Edinburgh and Exeter joined some of the UK's biggest arenas, including Belfast's Odyssey Arena, Manchester's MEN Arena, Birmingham's National Indoor Arena, the Sheffield Arena and Newcastle's Metro Radio Arena.

The tournament came to a conclusion with the play-offs on Monday 25 May at the Wembley Arena – coinciding with the Football League play-offs at the neighbouring Wembley Stadium over the same weekend. Phil Taylor was defending his Whyte & Mackay Premier League title once again, however he failed to retain it after losing to Mervyn King 10–6 in the semi-finals. James Wade beat King 13–8 in the final, to claim the £125,000 first prize and the first Premier League not to be claimed by Taylor.

Qualification 
The top six players from the PDC Order of Merit following the 2009 PDC World Darts Championship were confirmed on 5 January. Jelle Klaasen and Wayne Mardle were named as the two Sky Sports wild card selections on 9 January.

Qualifiers are as follows:

  Phil Taylor
  James Wade
  Raymond van Barneveld
  John Part
  Terry Jenkins
  Mervyn King
  Wayne Mardle
  Jelle Klaasen

Venues
Fifteen venues were used in the 2009 Premier League, with the only changes from 2008 being Edinburgh and Exeter replacing Plymouth and Bournemouth.

Prize money 
The prize fund increased again with the top prize now reaching £125,000, and the total prize fund rising to £400,000.

Results 
 Players in italics are challengers, and games involving them are best of 12 legs, not best of 14 as the regular matches, and they also don't count towards the standings.

League stage

5 February – Week 1 
 Echo Arena, Liverpool

12 February – Week 2 
 Royal Highland Centre, Edinburgh

19 February – Week 3 
 Ricoh Arena, Coventry

26 February – Week 4 
 Odyssey Arena, Belfast

5 March – Week 5 
 Metro Radio Arena, Newcastle upon Tyne

12 March – Week 6 
 MEN Arena, Manchester

19 March – Week 7 
 Brighton Centre, Brighton

26 March – Week 8 
 National Indoor Arena, Birmingham

2 April – Week 9 
 SECC, Glasgow

9 April – Week 10 
 Westpoint Arena, Exeter

16 April – Week 11 
 Trent FM Arena, Nottingham

23 April – Week 12 
 AECC, Aberdeen

30 April – Week 13 
 Sheffield Arena, Sheffield

7 May – Week 14 
 Cardiff International Arena, Cardiff

Notes 
† – Wayne Mardle didn't play in week ten because of a virus. John Part played two matches in week ten, with Mardle due to play two matches in week eleven, giving Part the night off that week. However, Mardle was rushed into hospital with mumps on 15 April, which ruled him out of week eleven. This meant that Mervyn King and James Wade each played twice during week eleven, with Mardle now due to play five matches in the last three weeks. Mardle had been due to play two matches in both weeks thirteen and fourteen, which would give King the night off in Sheffield, and Wade the night off in Cardiff. However, Mardle was re-admitted to hospital, ruling him out of week twelve, and in accordance with tournament regulations after missing three consecutive Premier League match nights, was removed from the tournament. Mardle's match results from the tournament were also annulled, hurting some of the remaining players more than others. Following Mardle's removal from the tournament, in order for each remaining night to have four matches, there was a series of challenge matches featuring Robert Thornton, Adrian Lewis, Dennis Priestley, Mark Webster and Gary Anderson.

* – Phil Taylor's average of 116.01 was, at the time, the highest recorded three-dart average in televised darts history. He broke his own record of 114.53, set against Wes Newton during the 2008 UK Open.

Play-offs – 25 May 
 Wembley Arena, London

Table and Streaks

Table 

Top four qualify for Play-offs after Week 14.
NB: LWAT = Legs Won Against Throw. Players separated by +/- leg difference if tied.

Streaks 

NB: W = Won;
D = Drawn;
L = Lost;
N/A = Did Not Play;
– indicates match did not count towards final standings

Player statistics 

The following statistics are only for league stage games that contributed to the final standings. Annulled fixtures, challenge matches and play-offs are not included.

Phil Taylor 
 Longest unbeaten run: 6
 Most consecutive wins: 3
 Most consecutive draws: 2
 Most consecutive losses: 1
 Longest without a win: 3
 Biggest victory: 8–2 (v. Jelle Klaasen, v. Raymond van Barneveld and v. Mervyn King)
 Biggest defeat: 4–8 (v. James Wade)

James Wade 
 Longest unbeaten run: 5
 Most consecutive wins: 4
 Most consecutive draws: 1
 Most consecutive losses: 1
 Longest without a win: 2
 Biggest victory: 8–1 (v. Terry Jenkins)
 Biggest defeat: 1–8 (v. Mervyn King)

Raymond van Barneveld 
 Longest unbeaten run: 3
 Most consecutive wins: 3
 Most consecutive draws: 1
 Most consecutive losses: 1
 Longest without a win: 3
 Biggest victory: 8–1 (v. John Part)
 Biggest defeat: 2–8 (v. Phil Taylor)

Mervyn King 
 Longest unbeaten run: 4
 Most consecutive wins: 3
 Most consecutive draws: 3
 Most consecutive losses: 2
 Longest without a win: 5
 Biggest victory: 8–1 (v. James Wade)
 Biggest defeat: 2–8 (v. Phil Taylor)

Terry Jenkins 
 Longest unbeaten run: 3
 Most consecutive wins: 1
 Most consecutive draws: 2
 Most consecutive losses: 3
 Longest without a win: 5
 Biggest victory: 8–3 (v. John Part)
 Biggest defeat: 1–8 (v. James Wade)

John Part 
 Longest unbeaten run: 2
 Most consecutive wins: 1
 Most consecutive draws: 2
 Most consecutive losses: 2
 Longest without a win: 4
 Biggest victory: 8–5 (v. Terry Jenkins)
 Biggest defeat: 1–8 (v. Raymond van Barneveld)

Jelle Klaasen 
 Longest unbeaten run: 2
 Most consecutive wins: 1
 Most consecutive draws: 2
 Most consecutive losses: 3
 Longest without a win: 6
 Biggest victory: 8–6 (v. Terry Jenkins)
 Biggest defeat: 2–8 (v. Phil Taylor)

References

External links 
 2009 Fixtures

Premier League Darts
Premier League Darts
Premier League Darts